Lois Elsa Hole, CM, AOE DStJ (née Veregin; 30 January 1929 – 6 January 2005) was a Canadian politician, businesswoman, academician, professional gardener and best-selling author. She was the 15th Lieutenant Governor of Alberta from 10 February 2000 until her death on 6 January 2005. She was known as the "Queen of Hugs" for breaking with protocol and hugging almost everyone she met, including journalists, diplomats and other politicians.

Early life and family
Lois Elsa Veregin was born in Buchanan, Saskatchewan, to Michael M. Veregin and Elsa Viktoria Norsten in 1929, not 1933, as was later misreported. Her family moved to Edmonton, Alberta in 1948, where she completed her education at Old Scona Academic High School.

In 1950, she met Ted Hole, a young University of Alberta agriculture student. Several years later they married and moved to a  farm near St. Albert, Alberta. Lois and Ted Hole ran a successful market garden business from their farm which they, along with their sons Bill and Jim, incorporated as Hole's Greenhouses & Gardens Ltd. in 1979. It remained one of Western Canada's largest retail greenhouse stores until it closed in early 2011 when the Hole family moved the operation to their new site on the edge of Lois Hole Centennial Provincial Park, and opened the Enjoy Centre.

Personal education and involvement in education

She received her secondary education at Strathcona High School (now known as Old Scona Academic High School) and then her ATCM (her associates diploma) in Music from the Royal Conservatory of Music, Toronto, Ontario.

In 1983, she was awarded an honorary doctorate Doctor of Athabasca University and in 1997 received a Distinguished Citizen Honorary Diploma in Business from Grant MacEwan College and in 2000 received an Honorary Doctorate in Laws from the University of Alberta.  In 2003 she received an Honorary Degree in Horticulture from Olds College, Olds, Alberta.

She was a school trustee at St. Albert School District No. 6 in 1998, was a trustee and chairperson, Sturgeon School Division, was on the Athabasca University Governing Council, and Chancellor of University of Alberta, 1998–2000.

She was the Keynote speaker at the Alberta College Graduation Ceremony in 2000, at Strathcona Composite High School Commencement ceremony in 2001, and at the Strathcona Composite High School commencement ceremony in 2003.

Writings
In 1993, Hole wrote her first book, Vegetable Favourites, and went on to write five more in the "Favourites" series. There are currently more than 1,000,000 copies of the various books in this series in print. The series won the Educational Media Award from the Professional Plant Growers Association in 1996. In 1998, Hole's Greenhouse began publishing their own books starting with Hole's autobiographical I'll Never Marry a Farmer. She also wrote several books with her son, Jim. Hole's Greenhouse has continued to publish gardening books along with a successful annual magazine, Lois' Spring Gardening.

Lieutenant Governor
Hole was appointed Lieutenant Governor of Alberta by Prime Minister Jean Chrétien in December 1999, and assumed office on 10 February 2000. One of her first acts as Lieutenant Governor was to discuss with Premier Ralph Klein over his government's controversial legislation which expanded the role of private providers in public health care, nonetheless she pledged to avoid a constitutional crisis and signed the bill into law.

Ted and Lois Hole's deaths
During his wife's term in office, Ted Hole died of cancer in April 2003. Lois Hole had been diagnosed with abdominal cancer in 2002, making a public announcement the following year when she began treatment in early 2003. Her health improved, temporarily, but by late 2004, her case was terminal. Her illness prevented her from making several scheduled public appearances. She died in office at the Royal Alexandra Hospital in Edmonton on 6 January 2005, aged 75.

A public memorial was held for Hole at Edmonton's Winspear Centre. Governor General of Canada Adrienne Clarkson was criticized for failing to attend Hole's memorial service. Rideau Hall issued a statement saying the Governor General was, at the time, abroad representing Canada at the inauguration of the President of Ukraine, Victor Yushchenko. However, the inauguration was postponed, and it was felt that Clarkson could have returned to Canada for the service. When it was later reported by the Toronto Sun and The Globe and Mail that Clarkson would wait in Paris, France, for the rescheduled presidential investiture, more outrage was expressed in the press, which was only compounded when Rideau Hall informed the public that the Governor General would also attend a "long-standing engagement" with the Queen at Sandringham House, contradicting reports that Buckingham Palace had said the dinner was actually booked at the last minute. In response, some monarchists began lobbying Clarkson to resign, had she willingly used the Queen for publicity and damage control purposes.

Most sources cited 1933 as Lois Hole's year of birth based on her reported age at death. However, the Edmonton Journal, the Royal Alberta United Services Institute's newsletter and the Legislature of Alberta all indicate that she was born in 1929. The Office of the Lieutenant Governor of Alberta confirmed that Hole was born on 30 January 1929.

Awards and legacy
She was appointed a Member of the Order of Canada in 1999 and a Dame of Justice of the Most Venerable Order of the Hospital of St John of Jerusalem in 2000. In 1995, she was named Edmonton Business and Professional Woman of the Year and St. Albert's Citizen of the Year. In 2003 she was awarded the Gandhi, King, Ikeda Humanitarian Award. She was made an "Honorary Patricia" by the 1st Battalion Princess Patricia's Canadian Light Infantry.

The Alberta Library Trustees Association (ALTA) established the Lois Hole Award in 2001. In November 2004, two months before Lois Hole's death, the Capital Health Authority in Edmonton announced that a new wing of the Royal Alexandra Hospital would be named the Lois Hole Hospital for Women. It opened 13 April 2010 and consolidated the women's health programs and services based at the Royal Alexandra Hospital into one building.

On 19 April 2005, the Lois Hole Centennial Provincial Park was established, becoming the 69th provincial park in Alberta. The park contains the former Big Lake Natural Area and an additional 302 hectares of Crown land, for a total of 1421 hectares. The lake comprises approximately 59 percent of the park's total area.

In 2008 the Edmonton Public Library opened the Lois Hole Library in Callingwood North. It features a sculpture of Lois Hole by Danek Mozdzenski and a reading garden. In 2009, the City of St. Albert declared 14 May to be Lois Hole Day. A bronze statue designed by Barbara Paterson called A Legacy of Love and Learning was unveiled at city hall on this day.

Bibliography
 Lois Hole's Vegetable Favourites (originally published as Northern Vegetable Gardening)
 Lois Hole's Bedding Plant Favourites  (originally published as Northern Flower Gardening: Bedding Plants)
 Lois Hole's Perennial Favourites
 Lois Hole's Tomato Favourites
 Lois Hole's Rose Favourites
 Lois Hole's Favourite Trees & Shrubs
 I'll Never Marry a Farmer
 Herbs & Edible Flowers
 The Best of Lois Hole
 Lois Hole's Favourite Bulbs'
* Bedding Plants Q&A (with son Jim Hole)
 Roses Q&A (with son Jim Hole)
 Perennials Q&A (with son Jim Hole)
 Vegetables Q&A (with son Jim Hole)
 Trees & Shrubs Q&A (with son Jim Hole)
 Lois' Spring Gardening annual magazine 1998–2008Lois Hole Speaks: Words that Matter'' (collected speeches, edited by Mark Lisac, published posthumously)

Arms

References

Sources

External links

"Good harvest for a lifetime of work: Lois Hole leaves enduring legacy in agriculture"
Obituary for Lois E. Hole
Royal Alberta United Services Institute (RAUSI) newsletter (PDF) 
Government of Alberta Tourism, Parks and Recreation site
"Hole's Greenhouses" website

1929 births
2005 deaths
Age controversies
Athabasca University people
Canadian businesspeople in retailing
Canadian garden writers
Canadian gardeners
Canadian book publishers (people)
Canadian people of Russian descent
Canadian people of Swedish descent
Deaths from cancer in Alberta
Chancellors of the University of Alberta
Dames of Justice of the Order of St John
Lieutenant Governors of Alberta
Members of the Order of Canada
Businesspeople from Saskatchewan
Writers from Saskatchewan
Members of the Alberta Order of Excellence
People from Buchanan, Saskatchewan
Canadian women academics
Women academic administrators
Canadian women in business
Women in Alberta politics
Canadian women viceroys
Women book publishers (people)
21st-century Canadian politicians
21st-century Canadian women politicians
Canadian academic administrators